Dövlətyarlı (also, Dövlətkarlı, Dovlyatkyarly, and Dovlyatyarly) is a village in the Fuzuli District of Azerbaijan.

References 

Populated places in Fuzuli District